At the 1906 Summer Olympics in Athens, four wrestling events were contested, all in Greco-Roman style for men.   Now called the Intercalated Games, the 1906 Games are no longer considered as an official Olympic Games by the International Olympic Committee.

Medal summary

Medal table

See also
 List of World and Olympic Champions in men's freestyle wrestling
 List of World and Olympic Champions in Greco-Roman wrestling

References

1906 Intercalated Games events
1906
International wrestling competitions hosted by Greece